Johnny Best (born in Canada) is an Australian former middleweight boxer who competed in the 1940s. Best was raised in Brisbane had a career record of 6-1-0. 5 of his wins came by KO.

External links

Canadian emigrants to Australia
Boxers from Brisbane
Sportsmen from Queensland
Year of birth missing
Possibly living people
Australian male boxers
Middleweight boxers